Scythris inspersella, the Norfolk owlet, is a moth of the family Scythrididae, first described by the German entomologist Jacob Hübner in 1817. It has a Holarctic distribution.

Description
The wingspan is 13–15 mm. The forewings are black with blueish-white scales. The hindwings are dark ochreous brown. Adults are on wing from July to August, flying during the day, visiting flowers.

The larvae feed (usually gregariously) on rosebay willowherb (Chamerion angustifolium), broad-leaved willowherb (Epilobium montanum) and great willowherb (Epilobium hirsutum). They spin the terminal shoots of their host plant together. Larvae can be found in June and July.

Distribution
The moth is found in Asia, Europe and North America. In Great Britain it was first found at Hockwold, Norfolk in 1977, although not identified until 1980. It has since been found elsewhere in Norfolk, Yorkshire (2001) and Tunstall Common, Suffolk.

References

External links
 Plant Parasites of Europe

inspersella
Moths described in 1817
Moths of Asia
Moths of Europe
Moths of North America
Taxa named by Jacob Hübner